Gilliam County is one of the 36 counties in the U.S. state of Oregon. As of the 2020 census, the population was 1,995, making it the third-least populous county in Oregon. The county seat is Condon. The county was established in 1885 and is named for Cornelius Gilliam, a colonel who commanded the forces of the provisional government of Oregon after the Whitman Massacre.

History

The Oregon Legislative Assembly created Gilliam County on February 25, 1885, from the eastern third of Wasco County after residents complained that they were too far from their county seat in The Dalles. The first Gilliam county seat was at Alkali, now Arlington. The question of a permanent county seat was placed on general election ballots in 1886, 1888, and again in 1890, when voters chose to move the county seat to Condon, known to early settlers as "Summit Springs." Once the question of the location of the county seat was settled, voters in Gilliam County proved reluctant to provide a courthouse in Condon. The county government operated out of a two-room house until 1903, when the county court appropriated money to construct a courthouse.  This courthouse burned down in 1954 and was replaced the following year with the current courthouse.

The Shepherds Flat Wind Farm, an 845 megawatt (MW) wind farm, began construction near Arlington in 2009, shortly after approval by state regulators. The wind farm was being built by Caithness Energy using General Electric (GE) 2.5 MW wind turbines, and it will supply electricity to Southern California Edison. In April, 2011, Google announced they had invested $100 million in the project. The wind farm was estimated to have an economic impact of $16 million annually for Oregon.

Geography

Gilliam County is located in the central northern part of Oregon, east of the Cascade Range. While its southern and eastern borders are defined by its neighboring counties, its western border is defined by the John Day River and its northern border is defined by the Columbia River. Most of the county is mostly flat, but contains various canyons created by streams from the Blue Mountains.

Adjacent counties
 Klickitat County, Washington - north
 Morrow County - east
 Wheeler County - south
 Wasco County - southwest
 Sherman County - west

Demographics

2000 census
As of the census of 2000, there were 1,915 people, 819 households, and 543 families living in the county.  The population density was 2 people per square mile (1/km2).  There were 1,043 housing units at an average density of 1 per square mile (0/km2).  The racial makeup of the county was 96.76% White, 0.16% Black or African American, 0.84% Native American, 0.16% Asian, 1.15% from other races, and 0.94% from two or more races.  1.83% of the population were Hispanic or Latino of any race. 18.2% were of German, 18.1% American, 12.6% English, 12.5% Irish and 5.3% Scottish ancestry.

There were 819 households, out of which 27.60% had children under the age of 18 living with them, 57.90% were married couples living together, 5.90% had a female householder with no husband present, and 33.60% were non-families. 29.50% of all households were made up of individuals, and 12.10% had someone living alone who was 65 years of age or older.  The average household size was 2.31 and the average family size was 2.85.

In the county, the population was spread out, with 23.20% under the age of 18, 5.40% from 18 to 24, 25.60% from 25 to 44, 26.70% from 45 to 64, and 19.10% who were 65 years of age or older.  The median age was 43 years. For every 100 females there were 102.20 males.  For every 100 females age 18 and over, there were 96.30 males.

The median income for a household in the county was $33,611, and the median income for a family was $41,477. Males had a median income of $30,915 versus $20,852 for females. The per capita income for the county was $17,659.  About 6.70% of families and 9.10% of the population were below the poverty line, including 11.00% of those under age 18 and 6.60% of those age 65 or over.

2010 census
As of the 2010 census, there were 1,871 people, 864 households, and 508 families living in the county. The racial makeup of the county was 95.2% white, 1.0% American Indian, 0.7% Pacific islander, 0.2% Asian, 0.2% black or African American, 1.4% from other races, and 1.4% from two or more races. Those of Hispanic or Latino origin made up 4.7% of the population. In terms of ancestry, 28.4% were German, 18.5% were English, 15.5% were Irish, and 8.3% were American.

Of the 864 households, 22.5% had children under the age of 18 living with them, 48.4% were married couples living together, 6.4% had a female householder with no husband present, 41.2% were non-families, and 35.6% of all households were made up of individuals. The average household size was 2.14 and the average family size was 2.74. The median age was 49.7 years.

The median income for a household in the county was $42,148 and the median income for a family was $52,885. Males had a median income of $34,340 versus $35,962 for females. The per capita income for the county was $25,559. About 9.8% of families and 10.6% of the population were below the poverty line, including 18.3% of those under age 18 and 10.8% of those age 65 or over.

Communities

Cities
Arlington
Condon (county seat)
Lonerock

Unincorporated communities

Blalock
Clem
Gwendolen
Mayville
Mikkalo
Olex
Rock Creek
Thirtymile

Government and infrastructure
The Northern Oregon Regional Corrections Facility (Norcor), a short-term jail, serves Gilliam, Hood River, Sherman, and Wasco counties.

Politics

Though Gilliam County is located in central Oregon, politically it falls in line with the eastern side of the state. The majority of registered voters who are part of a political party in Gilliam County, as well as most counties in eastern Oregon, are members of the Republican Party. The last time a Democrat carried a clear majority of the votes in Gilliam was in 1964 with Lyndon Johnson, though Bill Clinton was able to win it by a plurality in 1996 and had lost it by just three votes in 1992. In the 2008 presidential election, 58.36% of Gilliam County voters voted for Republican John McCain, while 38.74% voted for Democrat Barack Obama and 2.88% of voters either voted for a Third Party candidate or wrote in a candidate. These numbers show a small but clear shift towards the Democratic candidate when compared to the 2004 presidential election, in which 66.3% of Gilliam Country voters voted for George W. Bush, while 32.5% voted for John Kerry, and 1.2% of voters either voted for a third-party candidate or wrote in a candidate.

Despite its Republican lean, Gilliam County has still been willing to vote for Democrats at the state level; for example, Senator Ron Wyden won the county in the 1998, 2004, 2010, and 2016 elections. This streak, however, ended in 2022 when Republican Jo Rae Perkins won most of the county’s votes.

Economy

Gilliam County is in the heart of the Columbia River Plateau wheat-growing region. The economy is based on agriculture, and wheat, barley and beef cattle are the principal products.

The largest individual employers in the county are two subsidiaries of Waste Management Inc., Chemical Waste Management of the Northwest and Oregon Waste Systems, Inc., who run two regional waste disposal landfills.  By levying a fee of $1 a ton, Gilliam County receives enough money to pay the first $500 of the property tax bills of its inhabitants, an amount that covers the full tax bill for almost half of the county inhabitants, as well as funding other county projects.

Hunting, fishing and tourism are secondary industries. Transportation also contributes to the local economy; two major rivers, the John Day and Columbia, cross the area east-to-west, as does Interstate 84. Oregon Route 19 connects the county's major cities north-to-south and provides access to the John Day Valley.

See also

 National Register of Historic Places listings in Gilliam County, Oregon

References

Further reading

External links
Entry for Gilliam County in the Oregon Blue Book

 
1885 establishments in Oregon
Populated places established in 1885